Tramshed may refer to a tram depot. It may also refer to:

Entertainment venues
 Tramshed, Cardiff, a music and arts venue in Cardiff, Wales
 Tramshed, a side-by-side nightclub to the Zoo Bar (Halifax, West Yorkshire)
 The Tramshed, a theatre, arts and music venue in Woolwich, London
 The Tramshed, part of Swansea Museum (and formerly part of the Maritime and Industrial Museum)